
This is a list of aircraft in alphabetical order beginning with 'Tm'.

Tm

TM 
(TM Aircraft (W Terry Miller), Furlong, PA)
 TM-5
 TM-5A
 TM-5B

TMM Avia 
 TMM Avia T-10 Avia-Tor

References

Further reading

External links 

 List of aircraft (T)